The Last Outlaw is a 1980 Australian four-part television miniseries based on the life of Ned Kelly. It was shot from February to May 1980 and the end of its original broadcast, in October–November 1980, coincided with the centenary of Ned Kelly's death.

The complete miniseries has been released on region 4 DVD in Australia by Umbrella Entertainment.

Cast
 John Jarratt – Ned Kelly
 Steve Bisley – Joe Byrne
 Elaine Cusick – Mrs. Kelly
 Lewis Fitz-Gerald – Tom Lloyd
 John Ley – Dan Kelly
 Ric Herbert – Steve Hart
 Peter Hehir – Aaron Sherritt
 Debra Lawrance – Maggie Kelly
 Sigrid Thornton – Kate Kelly
 Tim Eliott – Steele

References

External links
 The Last Outlaw at Iron Outlaw
 

1980s Australian television miniseries
1980s Western (genre) television series
1980 Australian television series debuts
1980 Australian television series endings
Bushranger films
Cultural depictions of Ned Kelly
English-language television shows
Films directed by George T. Miller
Films scored by Brian May (composer)
Television shows set in colonial Australia
Films directed by Kevin James Dobson